Jeffrey Kline (born 13 May 1950), more commonly known as Jeff Kline, is a former Australian rules footballer who played for Geelong in the Victorian Football League (now known as the Australian Football League).

References

External links
 

1950 births
Living people
Geelong Football Club players
Australian rules footballers from Tasmania
Place of birth missing (living people)